Edappal is a town which lies near to the town of Ponnani in Ponnani taluk, Malappuram district, Kerala, India. Edappal lies in two panchayaths (local body), Vattamkulam, and Edappal. Edappal shares borders with Thuyyam, Polpakkara, Ayilakkadu, Vattamkulam, and Annakampadu. Sukapuram (also known as Chowwara), one of the earliest Brahmin settlements in Kerala, lies in Edappal. The Azhvanchery Thamprakkal of Athavanad (originally Maranchery), had influence over the Nambudiris of Sukapuram (Chowwara), while the Kalpakanchery Thamprakkal of Kalpakanchery influenced the rival Nambudiris of Panniyoor. Edappal forms a portion of the Malappuram metropolitan area as of 2011 Census. Edappal lies in Ponnani Kole Wetlands and is surrounded by the Biyyam backwater lake of Ponnani.

Notable people 
Artist Namboothiri
Sukumaran (Actor) 
Akkitham Achuthan Namboothiri
P.P. Ramachandran
Chekannur Maulavi
Edasseri Govindan Nair
Devdutt Padikkal (Cricketer)

References

External links 

Cities and towns in Malappuram district
Populated waterside places in India
Kuttippuram area